Zygmunt Haupt (5 March 1907, in Ułaszkowce, Podole – 10 May 1975, in Winchester, Virginia, United States) was a Polish writer and painter.

Biography 
His father Ludwik was a school inspector, mother was a teacher. Initially he attended a school in Tarnopol. In 1925 he graduated from Kopernik gymnasium (high school) in Lwów and later studied engineering and architecture at the Lwów Politechnic. After the death of his father in 1928, he went to Paris, where he studied urban studies in 1931-1932 at Sorbonne. He started to write and paint there. After return to Lwów he became active in local cultural life.

In 1939 he was mobilized into the army and fought during the Invasion of Poland in the 10th Brigade of Motorized Cavalry of colonel Stanisław Maczek. After the Soviet invasion of Poland Haupt fled to Hungary and later to France. He survived the siege of Dunkirk and was evacuated to England. He served in the Polish army until 1946.

At the end of the war, Haupt married American Edith Norris from New Orleans, whom he met in Great Britain. They married in London and later moved to New Orleans, New York and Washington, settling in Virginia, where he lived the rest of his life. For three decades he contributed stories, articles, and memoirs in Polish to several periodicals, including the Paris-based emigre journal Kultura.

Awards that he received were Kultura'''s 1962 prize for literature, and the 1971 award of the Koscielski Foundation of Geneva for his contributions to Polish literature.

During his lifetime, Haupt published only one book, Pierścień z papieru (Paper Ring) in 1963 in Paris. After suffering a heart attack, Haupt died 10 May 1975 in the hospital in Winchester, Virginia. He was buried in New Orleans.

 Works 
 Pierścień z papieru (1963) - short story collection
 Szpica. Opowiadania, warianty, szkice (1989) - short story collection
 Baskijski diabeł (2007) - large collection of short stories and reports
 Z Roksolanii'' (2009) - collection of early writings, journalism, drawings

Footnotes

References

External links
 Zygmunt Haupt Papers at Stanford
Biography at Culture.pl (English)

1907 births
1975 deaths
Polish male writers
20th-century Polish painters
20th-century Polish male artists
University of Paris alumni
Polish emigrants to the United States
Polish military personnel of World War II
Polish male painters
People from Ternopil Oblast
People associated with the magazine "Kultura"